Athylia venosa is a species of beetle in the family Cerambycidae. It was described by Pascoe in 1864.

References

Athylia
Beetles described in 1864